George Fenner (10 February 1799 – 1871) was an English first-class cricketer who played for Cambridge Town Club in one match in 1821, totalling 35 runs with a highest score of 34.

A son of Sarah and Joseph Fenner. He married Eliza Longland (1801-?) in 1823.
A son George Philips Fenner (1824-1871) was baptised at St. Michaels, Cambridge on 27 June 1824.

References

Bibliography
 

English cricketers
English cricketers of 1787 to 1825
Cambridge Town Club cricketers
1799 births
1871 deaths